Edge Church, registered as Edge Church International, formerly Southside Christian Church, is a multi-campus and non-denominational Australian church established in 1994. It is based in Adelaide, South Australia and is currently pastored by Jonathan and Rebeka Fontanarosa.

Establishment
Edge Church International was originally called Southside Christian Church when it was established in 1994. Ps Danny Guglielmucci established Southside Christian Church in May of that year, with just 80 people in a small building at O'Halloran Hill.

By 1996, Southside had relocated from O'Halloran Hill to their current Adelaide South campus in Reynella in the Adelaide southern suburbs. The church relocated to what had previously been the Old Reynella Markets in Old Reynella.

In 2006, Southside Christian Church was renamed to become Edge Church International, reflecting a broader reach outside of just the South of Adelaide.

In 2014, Edge Church saw a major transition in leadership from Ps Danny Guglielmucci as the founding pastor, to its current lead pastor Jonathen Fontanarossa.

Church growth
In 2001 a second campus based in the central area of Adelaide was established. Initially meeting at the Wonderland Ballroom in Hawthorn, the Southside City campus was forced to move seven times in two years as it experienced rapid growth. Ultimately, the Edge Church City campus was located in the Hindley Street cinema complex, in the Adelaide CBD before amalgamating with the West Campus in 2015.

Westside Assembly of God at Findon became the Edge Church West campus in 2006. Edge Church then expanded internationally, with the Edge Church Bristol campus being established in 2008, based out of Aztec West, in Bristol, England. The Edge Church Melbourne campus was then established in 2010, in the suburb of Burwood in Melbourne, to leave Edge Church currently with four campuses.

Edge Church is also projected to launch another four campuses; in the eastern suburbs of Adelaide, Singapore, Long Island in New York, US, and in the city centre of Bristol, England.

Mission work
Edge Church has been known for its mission work, both locally and abroad. For many years, the church was involved in community projects around Adelaide, including renovations of Morphett Vale High School, the Adelaide Women's and Children's Hospital accommodation and out-patient wards, the Childhood Cancer Association accommodation units and their head office, and the Adelaide Women's Prison Living Skills Unit. Edge Church has partnerships with different community organisations, such as the Childhood Cancer Association, Transform Cambodia, Missions. Me and, previously, World Vision Australia.

Edge Church has hosted an annual "Run to RED" (rescue, empower, deploy) event, where the church raises money for different community partners. By 2019, the Run to RED events across the global campuses had raised over A$2.1 million for local and global mission. The recipients of these funds included partners such as evangelical group Missions.Me and AngelHouse.

See also
 Youth Alive

References

External links
Official website

Churches in Adelaide
Pentecostal churches
Australian Christian Churches
Christian organizations established in 1994
Evangelical megachurches in Australia